Michael Kennedy (born April 13, 1972) is a Canadian former professional ice hockey centre who played 145 games in the National Hockey League for the Dallas Stars, Toronto Maple Leafs and New York Islanders from 1995 to 1999.

Career 
Kennedy was drafted 97th overall by the Minnesota North Stars in the 1991 NHL Entry Draft. He played 152 career NHL games, scoring 16 goals and 36 assists for a total of 52 points.

From 1999 to 2005, Kennedy played in the Deutsche Eishockey Liga in Germany.

In 2000, he helped the Munich Barons win the championship.

Kennedy worked as the head coach of the Yokohama Grits of the Asia League Ice Hockey.

Career statistics

Regular season and playoffs

Awards
 WHL West Second All-Star Team – 1992

References

External links
 

1972 births
Living people
Adler Mannheim players
Canadian expatriate ice hockey players in Germany
Canadian ice hockey centres
Dallas Stars players
Ice hockey people from Toronto
Iserlohn Roosters players
Kalamazoo Wings (1974–2000) players
Lowell Lock Monsters players
Minnesota North Stars draft picks
Minnesota North Stars players
München Barons players
New York Islanders players
Oklahoma Coyotes players
St. John's Maple Leafs players
Seattle Thunderbirds players
Toronto Maple Leafs players
Vancouver VooDoo players